Area codes 510 and 341 are telephone area codes in the North American Numbering Plan (NANP) serving much of the East Bay in the U.S. state of California. They cover parts of Contra Costa County and western Alameda County, including the city of Oakland, but excluding Dublin, Livermore, Pleasanton, and Sunol.

Area code 510 was established on September 2, 1991, in a split from area code 415. On March 4, 1998, the inland portion of the East Bay was split off as area code 925. The dividing line followed the Berkeley Hills; almost everything west of the hills stayed in 510, while everything east of the hills transferred to 925.

In response to projections that 510 would exhaust in the second quarter of 2019, the California Public Utilities Commission approved the addition of an overlay area code, 341, to serve the East Bay. The first central office codes in 341 became available on July 22, 2019. 
Ten-digit dialing became mandatory in the East Bay a month earlier, on June 22.

Cities in the numbering plan area

Alameda County

 Alameda
 Albany
 Ashland
 Berkeley
 Castro Valley
 Cherryland
 Emeryville
 Fairview
 Fremont
 Hayward
 Newark
 Oakland
 Piedmont
 San Leandro
 San Lorenzo
 Union City

Contra Costa County

 Bayview-Montalvin
 Canyon
 Crockett
 East Richmond Heights
 El Cerrito
 El Sobrante
 Hercules
 Kensington
 North Richmond
 Pinole
 Port Costa
 Richmond
 Rodeo
 Rollingwood
 San Pablo
 Tara Hills

Introduction of 341
By 2016, the California Public Utilities Commission (CUPC) projected that NPA 510 would exhaust its numbering pool by the second quarter of 2019. In response, the commission held meetings in Berkeley, Oakland and Hayward in January and February 2017 to discuss area code relief for 510. The North American Numbering Plan Administrator (NANPA) proposed in May 2017 that CPUC relieve 510 by introducing the overlay area code 341 for the entire territory. NANPA had previously assigned 341 as the relief area code for 510 in 1999, but nationwide number pooling procedures eliminated the need at that time. The NANPA retained 341 for the then-future relief of 510. CPUC accepted the NANPA proposal in a decision on June 21, 2018. With the start of the overlay plan in July 2019, all customers in the numbering plan area can be assigned telephone numbers with either code, and must dial the area code for all calls; otherwise, a recorded message will remind them if they dial incorrectly.

Prior usage of 510 for TWX
In the United States, AT&T originally used NPA 510 for the TWX (TeletypeWriter eXchange) network. Western Union acquired the TWX network in 1969 and renamed it Telex II. By the 1970s, three TWX codes had been added (710 in the Northeast, 810 in Michigan, Ohio, Indiana, Kentucky, North Carolina, South Carolina, Georgia, Florida, Louisiana, Mississippi, and Alabama; and 910 west of the Mississippi). Each major city had one or more local exchange prefixes. Western Union upgraded the network to "4-row" ASCII operation (it previously used both "3-row" Baudot and ASCII transmission) and decommissioned the special TWX area codes in 1981.

In Canada, TWX used  610 (nationwide) from 1962 until the remaining numbers were moved to area code 600 in 1992.

See also
 List of California area codes

References

External links

510
510
Northern California